Abdul Aziz Zakari (born September 2, 1976) is a Ghanaian athlete specializing in the 100 metres. He was born in Accra, Ghana.

Participating in the 2000 Summer Olympics, he made it to the final of the 100 metres, but failed to finish after becoming injured at about the 35m mark.

Also participating in the 2004 Summer Olympics, he achieved second place in his 100 metres heat, thus making it through to the second round. Heading into the second round, he was victorious in a tough sprint, before achieving qualification from his semi-final. This good form was not able to continue, as he failed to finish in the final, staged on August 22, renowned as possibly the fastest collective 100 metre race in history, where six of the seven finishing athletes completed the race in ten seconds or less.

He finally, for the first time, achieved a sub-10 second run on June 14, 2005, in Athens when he ran 9.99 seconds in Asafa Powell's world record breaking race. The Ghanaian record currently belongs to Leonard Myles-Mills with 9.98 seconds.

In July 2006, Zakari was reported to have failed a drugs test for the banned substance stanozolol. The test was conducted In-Competition on 29 April 2006 at the IAAF Grand Prix Meeting in Dakar. On 25 September 2006 the IAAF suspended him for two years. After his suspension Zakari participated at the 2008 Summer Olympics in which he ran the fourth time in his 100 metres heat, behind Richard Thompson, Martial Mbandjock and Simone Collio. His time of 10.34 was the third losing time after the 10.25 of Nobuharu Asahara, advancing him to the second round. There he improved his time to 10.24, but finished in fifth place of his heat, causing his elimination from the competition.

Personal bests

Outdoor

Indoor

See also
 List of sportspeople sanctioned for doping offences

References

External links
 
 

1976 births
Living people
Ghanaian male sprinters
Athletes (track and field) at the 1996 Summer Olympics
Athletes (track and field) at the 2000 Summer Olympics
Athletes (track and field) at the 2004 Summer Olympics
Athletes (track and field) at the 2008 Summer Olympics
Olympic athletes of Ghana
Athletes (track and field) at the 1998 Commonwealth Games
Athletes (track and field) at the 2002 Commonwealth Games
Athletes (track and field) at the 2006 Commonwealth Games
Athletes (track and field) at the 2010 Commonwealth Games
Doping cases in athletics
Ghanaian sportspeople in doping cases
Sportspeople from Accra
Commonwealth Games competitors for Ghana
World Athletics Championships athletes for Ghana
African Games gold medalists for Ghana
African Games medalists in athletics (track and field)
African Games bronze medalists for Ghana
Athletes (track and field) at the 2003 All-Africa Games